

269001–269100 

|-bgcolor=#f2f2f2
| colspan=4 align=center | 
|}

269101–269200 

|-bgcolor=#f2f2f2
| colspan=4 align=center | 
|}

269201–269300 

|-id=232
| 269232 Tahin || 2008 QV || Szilvia Tahin (born 1975), wife of Hungarian discoverer Krisztián Sárneczky || 
|-id=243
| 269243 Charbonnel ||  || Stéphane Charbonnel (born 1973), a French amateur astronomer and professor of Physics || 
|-id=245
| 269245 Catastini ||  || Mario Catastini (born 1932), a retired Italian elementary-school teacher || 
|-id=251
| 269251 Kolomna ||  || Kolomna, one of the oldest cities in the Moscow region, founded around AD 1140 || 
|-id=252
| 269252 Bogdanstupka ||  || Bohdan Stupka (1941–2012), a Ukrainian actor and received many international awards. || 
|-id=300
| 269300 Diego ||  || Diego Rodriguez, a Spanish astrophotographer and co-founder of the M1 group of variable-star observers || 
|}

269301–269400 

|-id=323
| 269323 Madisonvillehigh ||  || Madisonville High School, Texas, is a long-time participant in the IASC minor planet search campaigns. || 
|-id=390
| 269390 Igortkachenko ||  || Igor Tkachenko (1964–2009), a Russian military pilot and posthumous Hero of the Russian Federation || 
|}

269401–269500 

|-id=484
| 269484 Marcia ||  || Marcia de Queiroz, the daughter of Portuguese-Swiss discoverer José De Queiroz || 
|-id=485
| 269485 Bisikalo ||  || Dmitry V. Bisikalo (born 1961), a specialist in interacting binary stars and numerical astrophysics, and deputy director of the Institute of Astronomy of the Russian Academy of Sciences || 
|}

269501–269600 

|-id=548
| 269548 Fratyu || 2009 WR || Fratyu Popov (1846–1903) was a Bulgarian public figure, revolutionary, teacher and judge. He came from an old family in Sopot and participated in the establishment of the Sopot Revolutionary Committee (1869). He was the prototype of the teacher Fratyu from the novel Under the Yoke by Ivan Vazov. || 
|-id=550
| 269550 Chur ||  || Chur, the oldest town in Switzerland || 
|-id=567
| 269567 Bakhtinov ||  || Pavel Ivanovich Bakhtinov (born 1963), a radio engineer, amateur astronomer and well-known astrophotographer. || 
|-id=589
| 269589 Kryachko ||  || Timur Valer'evič Krjačko (born 1970) an amateur astronomer and an observer of comets and discoverer of minor planets || 
|}

269601–269700 

|-bgcolor=#f2f2f2
| colspan=4 align=center | 
|}

269701–269800 

|-id=742
| 269742 Kroónorbert ||  || Norbert Kroó (born 1934), a renowned researcher of solid state physics, optics, laser physics and neutron physics and a member of the Hungarian Academy of Sciences || 
|-id=762
| 269762 Nocentini ||  || Francesca Nocentini (born 1975), a friend of Italian discoverer Gianluca Masi || 
|}

269801–269900 

|-bgcolor=#f2f2f2
| colspan=4 align=center | 
|}

269901–270000 

|-bgcolor=#f2f2f2
| colspan=4 align=center | 
|}

References 

269001-270000